JLA: Age of Wonder was a 2003 two-issue mini-series of comics from DC's Elseworlds imprint. Taking place from 1876 to 1913, the comics follow Clark Kent and Lex Luthor as they use superpowers to create technical innovations. The comics also follow the creation of the League of Science, a superhero league dedicated to spreading these innovations for the good of mankind. The series was written by Adisakdi Tantimedh, with art by P. Craig Russell and Galen Showman.

Plot

Issue One 
During the 1876 Philadelphia Centennial Exposition, Daily Planet reporter Lois Lane conducts an interview with Lex Luthor, a young businessman. Luthor tells Lane about his partnership with Thomas Edison's company, and how the technology will influence the world. Luthor is interrupted mid-sentence by a spectacle which amasses many guests: a flying man is carrying the Torch of the Statue of Liberty for the exposition. The flying man introduces himself to the onlookers as Clark Kent, and explains that he has incredible powers and abilities that he wanted to use for good during the dawn of this "age of wonder". Lois tells Kent that Lex Luthor could vouch for him to work with Thomas Edison. Before Luthor can give an answer, Clark accepts and flies to Edison's compound at Menlo Park, New Jersey.

At the compound, Edison is unwilling to hire Kent. However, Kent convinces Edison by shaping a palmful of sand into a light bulb using his powers. Upon impressing Edison employee Nikola Tesla with his workload, Tesla shares his complaints with Kent about Edison, concerned that Edison takes credit for everyone's contributions. Tesla is confused why Kent chose to not take advantage of his powers for his own benefits. Clark admits that he is not seeking personal fame and fortune, but rather knowledge. Luthor argues that in his view, the business of invention is all about money.

Tesla, Luthor, and Kent join Edison's rival George Westinghouse after Edison refuses to adopt Tesla's plans for alternating current electricity. Under Westinghouse, Clark Kent, who has adopted the name "Superman", works alongside Luthor to build a hydroelectric power station at Niagara Falls. Lois Lane arrives at the station to interview Kent and Luthor. Luthor claims the future lies on those who control the means of production and marketing of inventions, namely himself. Lois is shoved over the edge of Niagara Falls by a large mob of reporters summoned by Luthor, and is saved by Kent.

At the Kent residence, Clark adopts his costume. Curious to know why he has these powers, his parents lead Clark to their barn to show his "birthright": a small spaceship.

Kent shows the spaceship to Luthor, Tesla, and his coworkers, Ted Knight and Barry Allen. He tells them about his alien origins, and shows them a hologram of his birth world and its destruction. Luthor proposes to replicate the Kryptonian technology for profit. The group establishes the Luthor Company, and Ted Knight becomes "Starman" in the process of field testing a gravity rod during a thunderstorm. Knight tests the rod's energy on Kent, but the energy ricochets onto Barry Allen's experiment, causing the chemical to explode. Allen, unharmed, begins cleaning the mess with superhuman speed, thus becoming the "Human Flash".

Lane reports to Perry White that the Luthor Company is giving away cold wireless lamps for free. However, when the stocks of these lamps are exhausted, a riot breaks out. Outraged, Luthor lashes out at Kent for causing bad publicity for the company, leading to an argument over money. Kent later expresses regret to Lane over his responsibility in the riots, and Lane kisses him.

By 1897, America has become a technologically advanced nation. Kent is hosting the inauguration of the League of Science, an organization that will ensure that science cannot be misused. Among the guests, Captain Hal Jordan, whom Kent had helped select as Green Lantern of Earth, is not impressed with Kent's speech. During the party, Kent meets the Wayne family and their son, Bruce Wayne. Luthor proposes to Lane, who rejects him in favor of Kent. Kent and Lane marry within the year.

Lex Luthor falls ill with radiation poisoning while on an expedition from the Viennese Bohemian mountains. He sends a distress signal, and the League evacuates the crew and destroys the cargo. Due to radiation exposure, Luthor has lost his hair and is recuperating in a hospital. He meets with Tesla, who assures him that a prototype of their project will completed soon. Kent, who is arriving to visit Luthor in the hospital, overhears that the two are building a death ray. Kent tells Luthor that he will not allow it to be built. Clark and Lane pressure Luthor to abandon the project, but he is not convinced.

The League of Science meets in 1900, discussing how their charter prohibits weapons based on their scientific sources. The charter also prohibits League members from using their powers in political disputes, including in military ventures. Hal Jordan, who participated in a foreign war despite resigning from the military, defends his actions and calls his colleagues unrealistic. He argues that the charter should be changed,  as their inventions have given nations a new reason to fight wars. Kent adjourns the meeting and leaves, but Luthor and Jordan stay and agree that America's interests must be protected. The next day, the Wayne family is bombed, leaving only Bruce alive. The League discovers that a working-class terrorist group called the Spartans is responsible, and they go to the Lower East Side to find their headquarters.

The League finds the Spartan's headquarters deserted, and are attacked by the vigilante The Green Arrow. The group is then confronted by an angry mob. The Green Arrow explains that they are workers who are tired of being mistreated, and they seek their due for building the League's utopia. Arrow agrees with the League that the Spartans cannot be condoned for the deaths of the Wayne family, and promises to capture them. Meanwhile, Jordan and Luthor meet to discuss Superman's threat to their plans.

That night, Kent and Lane meet Jordan, who says there is trouble on the moon. Clark meets Jordan there, and Jordan shoots him into deep space. On Earth, he tells the League and Lois that Kent died in space, and his body cannot be recovered. Lane emotionally breaks down, and Jordan demands to discuss what's happened with Luthor.

The issue ends with the nation mourning Superman's death. A distraught Lane lies in her living room, and Luthor knocks on her door to court her.

Issue Two 
Ten years after the events of Issue One, America has become the most technologically advanced civilization on earth. As a result, World War I occurred years earlier than in the prime timeline.

The Green Arrow is killed while chasing two bank robbers to a warehouse facility. After the struggle, which results in the explosion of the facility, a woman emerges from the rubble unharmed and flies away. The League of Science, including its newest members Plastic Man and Ray Palmer, investigate. At the scene, they are joined by Batman, who suggests they focus on finding the flying woman.

Meanwhile, recent U.S. Secretary of Defense appointee Lex Luthor is enraged by the destruction of the warehouse, which he owned. The scientist, who is revealed to be Diana of Themyscira, is dismayed that no one could be rescued from the warehouse, but Luthor assures her that all will be okay. He promises that her mother and Amazon sisters will be free from German tyranny soon. Meanwhile, Bruce Wayne discovers that Luthor's holding company owns the destroyed warehouse, and concludes that Luthor is up to something.

In New York City, the League attends a charity event hosted by Bruce Wayne concerning the war in Europe. Princess Diana talks about the plight of the Amazons and their enslavement by Germany, and thanks America's role in supporting Themyscira. Lois Lane interviews the President and Luthor, who have opposing views about America's involvement in the war. Meanwhile, Wayne learns of Diana's involvement with Luthor. She demonstrates her powers to Wayne using Ted Knight's cosmic rod, and he becomes interested in her invulnerability.

When General Hal Jordan discovers the Germans possess highly advanced weaponry, and sees British forces being slaughtered in a hopeless fight, he steps in and, despite the Germans knowing the ring's weakness, defeats the Germans. He is recalled back to the United States and is reprimanded by Luthor for breaking America's neutrality, but instead is more concerned with the Germans' possession of technology and knowledge only he and Luthor know about. Luthor admits to supplying the Germans with weapons, stating that his plan is to weaken Europe with war while construction of the Death Ray is completed. He wants to force Germany's surrender with the ray, become an American hero, and become President.

Soon afterwards, London is bombed in a nuclear attack, killing 200,000 people including the royal family and destroying Parliament. Jordan attacks Luthor, but is stopped by Diana. Luthor fatally wounds Jordan with a fire axe, and as he lays dying, Jordan commands the Green Lantern ring to find Superman. The ring soon finds Clark Kent, who has been living for years on an asteroid satellite deep in space. 

America has formally declared war on Germany, and the League of Science is overwhelmed while providing humanitarian relief to the survivors of London. Barry Allen and Lois Lane are particularly affected by how inventions meant to bring innovation and good to the world have only invited death and destruction. The League notices a green streak of light, and discover Clark Kent wielding Jordan's power ring. Alongside Kent, the League prepares to stop the Germans from launching any more nuclear rockets.

Luthor discovers that Superman has returned and prepares to meet with Tesla to continue their plans. Diana, ridden with guilt over London's destruction, refuses to go. On his way to Wardenclyffe, Luthor contacts Bismarck to launch the rockets in three hours as part of his plan.

Diana is confronted by Batman. She reveals everything to him about Luthor's plans, and promises to lead him to the death ray. Batman recommends that is time for her to redeem herself. At Wardenclyffe, Luthor finds the death ray is fully operational, and Tesla wants to see his work in action. They are stopped by Batman and Diana, who inform Luthor that the President has issued a warrant for his arrest. Luthor tells them that if he is stopped, he will not be able to use the death ray to destroy rockets heading toward New York City.

In Germany, the League manages to capture the rocket base. Superman finds one of the rockets heading off course toward New York City. Luthor gives the order to shoot the rocket, but is informed it is slowing down. Superman stops the missile with his power ring and redirects it toward space. Luthor destroys the other rocket before aiming the death ray toward Superman. Meanwhile, Diana and Batman have Tesla evacuate the building. Diana is killed destroying the death ray. Luthor is arrested and sentenced to death.

In 1913, Superman announces the creation of the Justice League of Nations, a neutral zone where countries could settle disputes diplomatically. To ensure the League's trust, he places Jordan's power ring inside of a battery to be used by the Justice League of Nations to stop any nation from committing an act of aggression against another. After the inauguration, Superman and Lois Lane fly away to catch up on lost time. Meanwhile, newspapers read of Lex Luthor's execution.

See also 

 List of Elseworlds publications
 Nikola Tesla in popular culture
 Thomas Edison in popular culture

References

External links
Superman's 'Wonder'-Land: Adi Tantimedh talks JLA: Age of Wonder, Comic Book Resources, February 14, 2003 
Overview
Critiques on issue #1, Snap Judgements on issue #1 and #2 at the Fourth Rail
Superman homepage review of issue #1 and #2
Review of issue #1

2003 comics endings
Cultural depictions of Thomas Edison
Fiction set in 1876
Fiction set in 1893
Fiction set in 1896
Fiction set in 1900
Fiction set in 1911
Fiction set in 1913
Centennial Exposition
World War I alternate histories
Comics set during World War I